, formerly known as , is a Japanese video game development company located in Yodogawa-ku, Osaka, established in 1995. Its name was changed in 2000 to make it more easily pronounced to the Japanese.

Their first game was titled Kabuki Klash in 1995 for the Neogeo. They weren't well-known until 1997, when Atlus published the Snowboard Kids game. They have worked on existing franchises, such as Fullmetal Alchemist, Bleach or Bomberman. In 2007, they worked on Mistwalker's project, ASH: Archaic Sealed Heat.

Games developed
ASH: Archaic Sealed Heat
Bleach: Blade Battlers
Bomberman 64 (2001)
Bomberman Land 2
Bomberman Land 3
Bomberman Land (PSP)
Bomberman (Nintendo DS)
Bomberman Land Wii
Bomberman Kart
Bomberman Kart DX
Critical Blow
SaGa 2: Hihō Densetsu Goddess of Destiny
Far East of Eden: Kabuki Klash
Final Fantasy Explorers
Fullmetal Alchemist and the Broken Angel
Fullmetal Alchemist 2: Curse of the Crimson Elixir
Fullmetal Alchemist 3: Kami wo Tsugu Shoujo
Genei Tougi: Shadow Struggle
Happy! Happy!! Boarders
Heaven's Gate
Jet de Go!
Kaitou Twins
Moujya
Naruto: Uzumaki Chronicles
Primal Image Vol. 1
R-Type and R-Type II (compilations)
Sakurazaka Shouboutai
SBK: Snowboard Kids
Snowboard Kids
Snowboard Kids 2
Snowboard Kids Plus
Sub Rebellion
Trap Gunner
Typing Renai Hakusho: Boys Be...
Typing Shinken Shoubu: Musashi no Ken
U: Underwater Unit
Viewpoint 2064 (cancelled)
Wizardry: Tale of the Forsaken Land

References

External links
Racjin official site

Japanese companies established in 1995
Video game companies established in 1995
 
Video game companies of Japan
Video game development companies